Rivals is a 1923 German-British silent adventure film directed by Harry Piel and starring Piel, Inge Helgard and Adolf Klein. It premiered in Berlin on 23 February 1923.

Cast
 Harry Piel
 Inge Helgard
 Adolf Klein
 Karl Platen
 Charly Berger
 Albert Paulig
 Heinz Stieda
 Maria Wefers

References

Bibliography
 Grange, William. Cultural Chronicle of the Weimar Republic. Scarecrow Press, 2008.

External links

1923 films
Films of the Weimar Republic
German silent feature films
German adventure films
British silent feature films
British adventure films
1923 adventure films
Films directed by Harry Piel
German black-and-white films
Silent adventure films
1920s British films
1920s German films